Wisdom is an unincorporated community in southwest Benton County, Missouri, United States. Wisdom is located on the Hogles Creek arm of Truman Lake.

History
A post office called Wisdom was established in 1897, and remained in operation until 1956. The community was named for A. J. Wisdom, a settler.

References

Unincorporated communities in Benton County, Missouri
Unincorporated communities in Missouri